Timothy Marsden (1865–1932) was an English footballer who played in the Football League for Darwen.

References

1865 births
1932 deaths
English footballers
Darwen F.C. players
English Football League players
Association football forwards